Ezra Clark Stillman (1907-1995) laid out the criteria for extracting and standardizing the vocabulary of Interlingua. In 1937, Stillman replaced William Edward Collinson as Director of Research at the International Auxiliary Language Association (IALA), which presented Interlingua to the public in 1951. 

Stillman, who favored a naturalistic approach to interlinguistics,  rekindled trust in the impartiality of IALA's work. When World War II forced the Association to relocate to New York, Stillman established a new international staff there and led its intensive linguistic research until he obtained a position with the State Department in 1942. He was succeeded at IALA by Alexander Gode. 

Stillman died in New York City after a long struggle with cancer. For more information on E. Clark Stillman, see his biography at the website of the Union Mundial pro Interlingua.

Interlingua
American Esperantists
1907 births
1995 deaths
Deaths from cancer in New York (state)